See also September 1973 Argentine presidential election

The first Argentine general election of 1973 was held on 11 March. Voters chose both the President and their legislators.

Background 

The 1966 coup d'état against the moderate President Arturo Illia was carried out largely as a reaction to Illia's decision to honor local and legislative elections in which Peronists, officially banned from political activity following the violent overthrow of President Juan Perón in 1955, did well. Five years later, however, President Alejandro Lanusse found himself heading an unpopular junta, saddled by increasing political violence and an economic wind-down from the prosperous 1960s. Seizing the initiative, he gathered leaders from across the nation's political and intellectual spectrum for a July 1971 asado, a time-honored Argentine custom as much about camaraderie as about steak.
 
The result was Lanusse's "Great National Agreement," a road map to the return to democratic rule, including Peronists (the first such concession the military had made since Perón's 1955 exile). The agreement, however, bore little resemblance to what had been discussed and, instead, proposed virtual veto power for the armed forces over most future domestic and foreign policy.  This patently unacceptable condition led most political figures to dismiss the much-touted event as the "Great National Asado," instead.

A year later, President Lanusse made the much-anticipated announcement: elections would be held, nationally, on March 11, 1973.  Retaliating for Perón's unequivocal rejection of the 1971 accords, Lanusse limited the field of candidates to those residing in Argentina as of August 25, 1972 - a clear denial of the aging Perón the right to run on his own party's ticket (the likely winners). Perón did return to Argentina, however, on November 17, when, during a month-long stay, he secured the endorsement of prominent figures such as former President Arturo Frondizi of the Integration and Development Movement, Jorge Abelardo Ramos of the Popular Leftist Front (FIP), Popular Conservative Alberto Fonrouge, Christian Democrat Carlos Imbaud, and other, mainly provincial parties.  These diverse parties signed on to an umbrella ticket, led by the Justicialist Party and Perón's personal representative in Argentina, Héctor Cámpora.  Partly in recognition for their support and to provide a counter-weight to the left-leaning Cámpora, Perón had the Justicialist Liberation Front (FREJULI) nominate for Vice President Popular Conservative leader Vicente Solano Lima, a newspaper publisher respected across most of Argentina's vastly diverse political spectrum.

Given little time to campaign by the calculating Lanusse (who fielded his own candidate, Brigadier General Ezequiel Martínez, for his ad hoc Federal Republican Alliance), the nation's myriad parties jockeyed for alliances and rushed to name candidates. The main opposition, the centrist Radical Civic Union (UCR), put forth their 1958 nominee, former Congressman Ricardo Balbín (head of the party's more conservative wing). Hoping to carry the mantle of those supporting Lanusse, Social Policy Minister Francisco Manrique ran on the Federalist ticket and Américo Ghioldi, who had led a split in the Socialist Party in 1958, ran on his Democratic Socialist slate - refusing (as the traditional Socialists had done) to endorse the Popular Revolutionary Alliance headed by former Governor Oscar Alende (the runner-up in the 1963 election).

The March 11 polls went smoothly and the FREJULI, which needed 50% of the total to avoid a runoff as per Lanusse's agreement, garnered 49.6%.  The irony of the result, which came despite a 28% margin over the runners-up (the UCR), led the seasoned Balbín to petition President Lanusse for a waiver of the rule, something he granted, making the FREJULI alliance the winners of the March 11, 1973, election and paving the way for the definitive return of Juan Perón, whom Lanusse, many years later, would admit to being his "life's obsession."

Candidates 
 Justicialist Liberation Front (populist): Former Deputy Héctor Cámpora of Buenos Aires Province
 Radical Civic Union (centrist): Former Deputy Ricardo Balbín of Buenos Aires Province
 Federalist Popular Alliance (conservative): Former Minister of Social Policy Francisco Manrique of Mendoza Province
 Popular Revolutionary Alliance (social democratic): Former Gobernor Oscar Alende of Buenos Aires Province

Results

President

Chamber of Deputies

Senate

Provincial Governors

References 

Elections in Argentina
1973 in Argentina
Argentina
1973-03
March 1973 events in South America